The NCHC Defensive Defenseman of the Year was an annual award given out at the conclusion of the National Collegiate Hockey Conference regular season to the best defenseman in the conference as voted by the coaches of each NCHC team.

The Defenseman of the Year was first awarded in 2014 and is a successor to the CCHA Best Defensive Defenseman which was discontinued after the conference dissolved due to the 2013–14 NCAA conference realignment.

Prior to the 2016–17 season the Defensive Defenseman of the Year was known as the NCHC Defenseman of the Year.

Award winners

Winners by school

Defensive Defenseman of the Year

Winners by school

See also
NCHC Awards
CCHA Best Defensive Defenseman

References

External links

College ice hockey trophies and awards in the United States
National Collegiate Hockey Conference